Donovan Lloyd Sinclair (born 13 August 1985) is a Jamaican cricketer who has played for the Jamaica national team in West Indian domestic cricket. He is a right-arm leg-spin bowler.

Sinclair made his senior debut for Jamaica in May 2006, playing a 50-over match against the touring Indians. He failed to take a wicket, finishing with 0/29 from six overs. Sinclair's List A debut for Jamaica came in October 2007, against the Leeward Islands in the 2007–08 KFC Cup. He took 1/12 on debut and 2/20 in the next match against Barbados, but was not retained in the team for the finals. Sinclair made his first-class debut in May 2008, playing for a Jamaica Select XI against the touring Australians. He took 3/14 from 6.3 overs in Australia's first innings, dismissing Brad Haddin, Mitchell Johnson, and Stuart MacGill. He was subsequently retained in Jamaica's squad for the 2008–09 WICB Cup, but played only a single match, against Barbados.

References

External links
Player profile and statistics at CricketArchive
Player profile and statistics at ESPNcricinfo

1985 births
Living people
Jamaica cricketers
Jamaican cricketers
People from Saint Elizabeth Parish